is a railway station in the city of  Kitakami, Iwate Prefecture, Japan, operated by East Japan Railway Company (JR East).

Lines
Murasakino Station is served by the Tōhoku Main Line, and is located 492.2 rail kilometers from the terminus of the line at Tokyo Station.

Station layout
The station has two opposed side platform connected to the station building by a footbridge.  The station is staffed on consignment by Jaster Co., Ltd. Ordinary tickets, express tickets, and reserved-seat tickets for all JR lines are on sale.

Platforms

History
Murasakino Station was established as a signal stop on 5 March 1919, and was elevated to a passenger station on 1 November 1950. The station was absorbed into the JR East network upon the privatization of the Japanese National Railways (JNR) on 1 April 1987.

Passenger statistics
In fiscal 2018, the station was used by an average of 986 passengers daily (boarding passengers only).

Surrounding area
Kitakami River

See also
 List of Railway Stations in Japan

References

External links

  

Railway stations in Iwate Prefecture
Tōhoku Main Line
Railway stations in Japan opened in 1950
Kitakami, Iwate
Stations of East Japan Railway Company